Hilton Dhaka is a Hilton brand hotel located at Gulshan Avenue in Dhaka. The building is topped off, and the hotel is expected to open by 2025. At 152 meters height, it will be one of the tallest building in Dhaka. The building has 34 floors with 5 floors underground basement.

See also

 List of tallest buildings in Bangladesh
 List of tallest buildings in Dhaka

References

Buildings and structures in Dhaka
Hotels in Dhaka
Skyscrapers in Bangladesh
Skyscraper hotels
 
Hilton Worldwide